The Lockheed Martin AN/WLD-1 RMS (Remote Minehunting System) is a remotely controlled minesweeping system to be operated by surface warships. It consists of an unmanned semisubmersible vehicle, which tows a sonar array, and control infrastructure aboard the parent ship. The unmanned semisubmersible vehicle used is the US Navy Snorkeler-Class Unmanned Surface Vehicle.

History
In 2013, the system completed developmental testing, and was found to meet "reliability, suitability and effectiveness requirements".

The system has been installed on the Littoral Combat Ship and on the USS Bainbridge.

References

External links 
 AN/WLD-1 RMS Remote Minehunting System
 AN/WLD-1 Remote Minehunting System (United States), AUTONOMOUS SEMI-SUBMERSIBLES
 Navy's Newest Mine Warfare Technology Being Tested at Ingleside
 AN/WLD-1

Minehunters
Lockheed Martin
Robotic submarines